Ian McCahon Sinclair  (born 10 June 1929) is a former Australian politician who served as leader of the National Party from 1984 to 1989. He was a government minister under six prime ministers, and later Speaker of the House of Representatives from March to August 1998.

Sinclair was born in Sydney and studied law at the University of Sydney. He later bought a farming property near Tamworth. Sinclair was elected to parliament in 1963, and added to the ministry in 1965 as part of the Menzies Government. Over the following six years, he held various portfolios under four other prime ministers. Sinclair was elected deputy leader of his party in 1971, under Anthony. He was a senior member of the Fraser Government, spending periods as Minister for Primary Industry (1975–1979), Minister for Communications (1980–1982), and Minister for Defence (1982–1983). In 1984, Sinclair replaced Anthony as leader of the Nationals. He led the party to two federal elections, in 1984 and 1987, but was replaced by Charles Blunt in 1989. Sinclair was father of the parliament from 1990 until his retirement at the 1998 election. He spent his last months in parliament as Speaker of the House of Representatives, following the sudden resignation of Bob Halverson; he is the only member of his party to have held the position. He also served as co-chair of the 1998 constitutional convention, alongside Barry Jones.

Along with Peter Nixon, Sinclair is one of two Country/Nationals MPs elected in the 1960s still alive, and he is the last surviving minister who served in the Menzies Government and the First Holt Ministry. He is entitled to the Right Honourable prefix as one of the few surviving Australian members of the Privy Council of the UK.

Early life
Sinclair was born in Sydney on 10 June 1929. He was the son of Gertrude Hazel (née Smith) and George McCahon Sinclair. His father was a chartered accountant who also served as deputy mayor of Ku-ring-gai Council, chairman of Knox Grammar School, and an elder of the Presbyterian Church.

Sinclair attended Knox Grammar before going on to the University of Sydney, where he graduated Bachelor of Arts in 1949 and Bachelor of Laws in 1952. He served in the No. 22 Squadron RAAF from 1950 to 1952, as part of the Citizen Air Force.  Sinclair served his articles of clerkship with Norton Smith & Co., but did not pursue a legal career. He instead took up a grazing property near Bendemeer and set up the Sinclair Pastoral Company, of which he became managing director. He was a director of the Farmers and Graziers' Co-operative Limited from 1962 to 1965.

Sinclair married Margaret Anne Tarrant in 1956, with whom he had one son and two daughters. She died of brain cancer in December 1967. He remarried on 14 February 1970 to Rosemary Fenton, who had been Miss Australia in 1960; they had one son together. His daughter Fiona married Liberal politician Peter King.

Political career
A member of the Country Party, Sinclair was appointed to the New South Wales Legislative Council in 1961. He resigned in order to seek election to the House of Representatives at the 1963 federal election, retaining the Division of New England for the Country Party after the retirement of David Drummond.

Government minister

In 1965, Sinclair was appointed Minister for Social Services in the Menzies Government, replacing Hugh Roberton. He stood for the deputy leadership of the Country Party after the 1966 federal election, but was defeated by Doug Anthony. In 1968, he became Minister for Shipping and Transport in the Gorton Government. When Country Party leader John McEwen retired in February 1971, Anthony was elected as his replacement and Sinclair defeated Peter Nixon for the deputy leadership. He was appointed Minister for Primary Industry. A month later, William McMahon replaced John Gorton as Liberal leader and prime minister. McMahon wanted Sinclair to become Minister for Foreign Affairs, but for various reasons had to keep him in the primary industry portfolio and appoint Les Bury as foreign minister instead. Sinclair did later serve as acting foreign minister in Bury's absence.

In 1973, Sinclair was one of the six Country MPs to vote in favour of John Gorton's motion calling for the decriminalisation of homosexuality. After spending the three years of the Whitlam Labor government in opposition, he again became Minister for Primary Industry in 1975, in the Fraser Government. In 1977, Sinclair was appointed to the Privy Council of the United Kingdom.

In 1978, New South Wales Attorney-General Frank Walker appointed Michael Finnane to inquire into the financial dealings of Sinclair's father George, who had died in January 1976. The Finnane Report, which was tabled in the Parliament of New South Wales on 27 September 1979, alleged that Ian Sinclair had improperly loaned himself money from companies he controlled, attempted to conceal the loans, and forged his father's signature on company returns. As a result, Sinclair resigned from the ministry. His supporters criticised the report on several grounds, including that the inquiry was conducted in secret, that its release prejudiced Sinclair's right to a fair trial, and that it was politically biased as both Walker and Finnane were members of the ALP.

In April 1980, Sinclair was charged with nine counts of fraud, relating to forging, uttering, and making false statements on company returns. He was found not guilty on all charges on 15 August 1980, following a 23-day trial in the District Court of New South Wales.

Sinclair returned to the ministry in August 1980 as Minister for Special Trade Representations. After the 1980 election he was made Minister for Communications. He was finally made Minister for Defence in May 1982, holding the position until the government's defeat at the 1983 election.

Party leader
Doug Anthony announced his resignation as NCP leader in December 1983. Sinclair was elected as his replacement on 17 January 1984, defeating Stephen Lusher by an unspecified margin. In an interview with Australian Playboy in July 1984, Sinclair acknowledged a previous extramarital relationship with socialite Glen-Marie North. Copies of the interview were distributed in his electorate during the 1984 election campaign. In the lead-up to the election, Sinclair controversially attributed the spread of HIV/AIDS in Australia to the Labor Party's recognition of de facto relationships and normalisation of homosexuality. After the deaths of three babies from HIV-contaminated blood transfusions, he stated that "if it wasn't for the promotion of homosexuality as a norm by Labor, I am quite confident that the very tragic and sad passing on of the AIDS disease [...] to those three poor babies would not have occurred.

In 1985, Sinclair came into conflict with the National Farmers' Federation over his claims that the organisation did not have the support of farmers. He also came into conflict with the Liberal Party on a number of occasions. He publicly rejected calls for a Liberal–National party merger, citing the incompatibility of the National Party's conservatism and the "small-l liberal" wing of the Liberal Party. In March 1986, he accused Liberals of undermining the leadership of John Howard and thereby harming the Coalition's chances of victory. He denounced former Liberal prime minister Malcolm Fraser's support of sanctions against apartheid South Africa, accusing him of "prejudice against Southern Africa and the whites there". Sinclair proclaimed a "deep abhorrence" of apartheid, but believed the sanctions were too "heavy-handed". He supported the re-admission of South Africa to the United Nations, the lifting of the sporting boycott, the re-establishment of an Australian trade commission, and direct flights between Australia and South Africa.

In addition to his leadership of the National Party, Sinclair continued to be the opposition spokesman on defence. In August 1986, he suggested the formation of a Pacific trade bloc at a meeting of the International Democrat Union in Sydney. The proposal, also supported by shadow foreign minister Andrew Peacock, was designed to "minimise the harmful policies of major protectionist trading nations" like the U.S. and the European Communities. Later in the year, Sinclair questioned the value of ANZUS, stating that Australia should reconsider its commitments to New Zealand as it had become too isolationist. He also believed Australia should adopt a more assertive role than provided for in the Dibb Report. He opposed trade sanctions on Fiji following the 1987 coups d'état and was accused by foreign minister Bill Hayden of sympathising with the perpetrators.

In the lead-up to the 1987 election, Sinclair dealt with the "Joh for Canberra" campaign, an ambitious bid by Queensland premier and state National leader Joh Bjelke-Petersen to enter federal politics and become prime minister. The campaign "derailed any semblance of non-Labor unity from the beginning of 1987", and resulting in the Coalition splitting. After the election, the Queensland branch continued its efforts to oust Sinclair from the leadership.

In the late 1980s, Sinclair was drawn into the debate over the levels of Asian immigration to Australia, favouring a reduction in the number of Asians allowed into the country. In August 1988, he said:

"What we are saying is that if there is any risk of an undue build-up of Asians as against others in the community, then you need to control it ... I certainly believe, that at the moment we need ... to reduce the number of Asians ... We don't want the divisions of South Africa, we don't want the divisions of London. We really don't want the colour divisions of the United States."

A few days later he "toned down his statements" at the request of Howard and denied that he had specifically targeted Asians. The following month, following pressure from Howard, he sacked National Senate leader John Stone from the shadow ministry for making similar comments, "with regret". This was seen by many in his party as a capitulation to the Liberals.

In May 1989, there were simultaneous leadership challenges in both Coalition parties, with Peacock displacing Howard as Liberal leader and Charles Blunt replacing Sinclair. The immediate trigger for Sinclair's defeat was dissatisfaction with his conditional support for the Hawke Government's deregulation of the wheat industry. However, there was also a sense that it was time for a generational change in the party leadership. When Blunt lost his seat at the 1990 election, Sinclair made an attempt to regain the NPA leadership, but was defeated by Tim Fischer, and retired to the back bench.  He was thus the first NPA leader since the formation of the Coalition to have never served as Deputy Prime Minister of Australia.

Post-leadership
Sinclair underwent a double heart bypass surgery in September 1991. On 23 March 1993, ten days after the Coalition lost the 1993 federal election, Sinclair unsuccessfully challenged Tim Fischer for the party leadership.

By 1993, Sinclair was the Father of the House, the only sitting MP to have served with Robert Menzies, and "the last of the Right Honourables" (MPs with membership in the Privy Council). He was seen as a candidate for the speakership if the Coalition won the 1993 election, however this did not eventuate. Aged nearly 70, Sinclair announced his intention to retire from parliament at the 1998 election. In February 1998 Howard appointed Sinclair as Chairman of the Constitutional Convention, which debated the possibility of Australia becoming a republic. When Speaker Bob Halverson suddenly resigned in March, Sinclair was elected to replace him. He served as speaker for the last seven months of his term, during which he usually wore an academic-style gown. At the time of his retirement, he was the last parliamentary survivor of the Menzies, Holt, Gorton and McMahon governments.

As a result of his election as Speaker, Sinclair wanted to remain in Parliament, in the event of the re-election of the Howard Government, in order to continued as Speaker.
However Sinclair had announced his retirement before Halverson's resignation as Speaker and the National Party had since selected Stuart St. Clair as his replacement in New England.

Sinclair's retirement could not be reversed and St. Clair refused to stand aside for him. St. Clair ultimately succeeded Sinclair at the 1998 election.

After politics
In January 2001, he was appointed a Companion of the Order of Australia (AC). As of 2009, Sinclair was the President of AUSTCARE, an international, non-profit, independent aid organisation. In 2000, Sinclair became the inaugural chairman of the Foundation for Rural and Regional Renewal (FRRR), a non-profit organisation which issues grants to regional communities. He retired in June 2019 and was succeeded by Tim Fairfax. Sinclair also served for several years as the Honorary President of the Scout Association of Australia, New South Wales Branch, retiring in 2019. He received Scouts’ National Presidents Award on World Scout Day 2020.

References

 

1929 births
Living people
Australian members of the Privy Council of the United Kingdom
National Party of Australia members of the Parliament of Australia
Members of the Cabinet of Australia
Companions of the Order of Australia
Members of the Australian House of Representatives for New England
Members of the Australian House of Representatives
Leaders of the Australian House of Representatives
People educated at Knox Grammar School
Speakers of the Australian House of Representatives
People from Tamworth, New South Wales
National Party of Australia members of the Parliament of New South Wales
Members of the New South Wales Legislative Council
Defence ministers of Australia
Leaders of the National Party of Australia
20th-century Australian politicians
Government ministers of Australia